DalekoArts is a Minneapolis area professional non-profit theatre company residing in New Prague, Minnesota, which was founded in 2012 by husband and wife team, Amanda White and Ben Thietje, with the aim to help decentralize professional theatre in the Twin Cities. The company's name, Daleko, is a Czech word meaning "far away," and reflects New Prague's strong bohemian roots, its spatial relationship to the cultural hub that is the Twin Cities, and the ensemble's desire to step back and examine the world from a new point of view. White currently serves as the company's Artistic Director; Thietje currently serves as the company's Executive Director.

History 
DalekoArts' inaugural season was held at the New Prague Middle School auditorium, and consisted of four productions (The Odd Couple, Forever Plaid, Almost, Maine, and Proof) over the course of three summer months. The following season saw the company move to a small ATV storage garage space on the southwest side of New Prague. This space was converted into a 40-seat space where the company produced three productions (Rancho Mirage, The Philadelphia Story, and Little Shop of Horrors) over the course of the summer.

Prior to Daleko's third season, the company moved into the Prague Theater on New Prague's Main Street. This former movie theater space was converted into a 78-seat live venue, and the company moved to year-round productions. Beginning with company's fourth season, the Friends of Friends series was created, which invited smaller productions from visiting Twin Cities companies to the Prague Theater, as part of the Daleko season.

Dissolution 
On Sunday, February 19, 2023, the DalekoArts board of directors formally voted to sunset the organization at the end of the 2022/23 season. The vote was taken after White and Thietje announced their intention to resign at the end of the 2022/23 season. The administration cited a completion of Daleko's organic lifecycle as the reasoning behind the decision to dissolve.

Production History 
Season Eleven (2022/23): The Thin Place, Irving Berlin's White Christmas, Chris Smith's White Chrismith, Native Gardens, Bright Star, Freegrass, OMG!, Live at the Prague III

Season Ten (2021/22): Holiday Show! the holiday show, Once, With or Without Uke, The Mysterious Old Radio Listening Society

Season Nine (2020/21): Daleko Home Invasion (online season)

Season Eight (2019/20): Ghost Tour, Adventures in Mating: Holiday Edition, Ada and the Engine, The Mysterious Old Radio Listening Society

Season Seven (2018/19): Godspell, City Council Christmas, Constellations, Peter and the Starcatcher, Harold, Ball: A Musical Tribute to My Lost Testicle, Live at the Prague 2

Season Six (2017/18): The Complete Works of William Shakespeare (abridged), A Chris Smith Carol, Middletown, She Loves Me, Sometimes There's Wine, Underneath the Lintel, The Towering Women of Malkin

Season Five (2016/17): Our Town, Snowed Inn, Stones in His Pockets, The Rink, Mortem Capiendum, Adventures in Mating, Live at the Prague

Season Four (2015/16): Wait Until Dark, Another Main Street Holiday, The Shape of Things, Urinetown, Fotis Canyon, Love Letters, Take It With You

Season Three (2014/15): Main Street Holiday, Love Letters, Barefoot in the Park, Always...Patsy Cline

Season Two (summer, 2014): The Philadelphia Story, Rancho Mirage, Little Shop of Horrors

Season One (summer, 2013): The Odd Couple, Forever Plaid, Almost, Maine, Proof

References 

Theatres
Theatres in Minnesota
Theatre companies
Theatre companies in the United States